Marshal of the Royal Air Force David Brownrigg Craig, Baron Craig of Radley,  (born 17 September 1929) is a retired Royal Air Force officer and member of the House of Lords. He was a fast jet pilot in the 1950s, a squadron commander in the 1960s and a station commander in the 1970s. He served as Chief of the Air Staff during the late 1980s, when the Boeing Airborne early warning and control system was ordered and the European Fighter programme was being developed. He then served as Chief of the Defence Staff during the Gulf War. He was granted a life peerage as Baron Craig of Radley after his retirement from active service in 1991, sitting as a crossbencher. As of 2022, he is the last living officer in the British Armed Forces to have held a five-star rank whilst on active service.

Early life
The son of Major Francis Brownrigg Craig and his wife Olive Craig, Craig grew up in the Irish Free State, and was largely unaffected by the events of the Second World War. In 1943 he came to Britain and started at Radley College where, in addition to his studies, he rowed, captained the school's first team at rugby and later became Head of School. He gained a place at Lincoln College, Oxford, where he graduated with a degree in mathematics, and joined the Oxford University Air Squadron.

RAF career
Craig was commissioned as a pilot officer on 19 September 1951 (with seniority from 19 December 1949). He was initially put through the pilot's course at No. 7 Flying Training School at RAF Cottesmore where he was promoted to flying officer on 19 March 1952 before earning his "wings" in April 1952. He went on to the Advanced Flying School at RAF Driffield where he was promoted to flight lieutenant on 19 December 1952 and then to 209 Advanced Flying School at RAF Weston Zoyland where he was a jet conversion instructor. In 1955 he joined No. 247 squadron at RAF Odiham which was converting from Meteors to Hunters. After attending the guided weapons course at the RAF Technical College at Henlow, he was posted to a missile evaluation site at North Coates. He was promoted to squadron leader on 1 January 1959
and posted to the Air Ministry later that year. He attended RAF Staff College in 1961 before joining No. 35 Squadron at RAF Coningsby in January 1963 initially as a flight commander and then as Officer Commanding the Squadron flying Vulcan B2 aircraft.

Promoted to wing commander on 1 January 1964, Craig was appointed Military Assistant to the then Chief of the Defence Staff, Field Marshal Sir Richard Hull in June 1965. He was awarded the Queen's Commendation for Valuable Service in the Air in the 1965 Birthday Honours.

Craig was appointed an Officer of the Order of the British Empire in the 1967 Birthday Honours and, having been promoted to group captain on 1 January 1968, he became Station Commander at RAF Cranwell later that year. He became Aide-de-Camp to the Queen in 1969. He was made Director (Plans and Operations) and Headquarters Far East Command in 1970, and having been promoted to air commodore on 1 January 1972, he became Station Commander at RAF Akrotiri in Cyprus later that year. He attended the Royal College of Defence Studies in 1974. Promoted to air vice-marshal on 1 January 1975, he became Assistant Chief of Air Staff (Operations) on 25 March 1975.

Appointed a Companion of the Order of the Bath in the 1978 Birthday Honours, Craig became Air Officer Commanding No. 1 Group later that year. He went on to be Vice-Chief of the Air Staff in 1980 and advanced to Knight Commander of the Order of the Bath in the 1981 New Year Honours. He was promoted to air marshal on 1 January 1981, and appointed to the post of Commander-in-Chief RAF Strike Command on 20 September 1982 with the acting rank of air chief marshal on 21 September 1982. He was promoted to the substantive rank of air chief marshal on 1 July 1983 and advanced to Knight Grand Cross of the Order of the Bath in the 1984 Birthday Honours.

Craig became Chief of the Air Staff on 15 October 1985 and appointed Air Aide-de-Camp to the Queen on the same date. As Chief of the Air Staff he advised the British Government on the ordering of the Boeing Airborne early warning and control system and the development of the European Fighter programme. Having been promoted to the rank of Marshal of the Royal Air Force on 14 November 1988, he became Chief of the Defence Staff on 9 December 1988. As Chief of the Defence Staff he advised the British Government on the deployment of 45,000 servicemen and women during the Gulf War. He retired from service in 1991.

Later work
On 30 July 1991, following his retirement from the RAF, Craig was made a life peer as Baron Craig of Radley, of Helhoughton in the County of Norfolk. In retirement he was a Director of ML Holdings plc from 1991 to 1992. He was the Convenor of the Crossbench Peers in the House of Lords from December 1999 until July 2004 and Chairman of the Council of King Edward VII's Hospital from 1998 to 2004. He was awarded an honorary DSc. from Cranfield University in 1988.

Personal life
Craig married Elisabeth June Derenburg in 1955; they have two children: The Hon. Christopher Craig (born 1957) and The Hon. Susan Craig (born 1960). His interests include fishing and shooting.

Arms

Notes

References

Sources

External links
theyworkforyou.com – Lord Craig of Radley
The Public Whip – Voting Record – Lord Craig of Radley

|-

|-

|-

|-

|-

|-

1929 births
Living people
Military personnel from Dublin (city)
Marshals of the Royal Air Force
Chiefs of the Air Staff (United Kingdom)
Crossbench life peers
Alumni of Lincoln College, Oxford
Knights Grand Cross of the Order of the Bath
Officers of the Order of the British Empire
Recipients of the Commendation for Valuable Service in the Air
People educated at Radley College
Chiefs of the Defence Staff (United Kingdom)
Graduates of the Royal College of Defence Studies
Life peers created by Elizabeth II